Damien Healy is a former Gaelic footballer from County Westmeath, Ireland. He played for the Westmeath county team from 1996 to 2010. He won National League Division 2 medals in 2001, 2003 and 2008, and was centre back on the 2004 Leinster Championship winning team. He also won Railway Cup honours with Leinster. He played his club football with St Mary's Rochfortbridge.

References

Year of birth missing (living people)
Living people
Gaelic football backs
Irish lecturers
St Mary's (Westmeath) Gaelic footballers
Westmeath inter-county Gaelic footballers